Mahuaon is a village in the southern part of Bihiya block, in Bhojpur district, Bihar, India. As of 2011, its population was 3,093, in 457 households.

References 

Villages in Bhojpur district, India